Ronny Labonnne (born 14 September 1997) is a Martiniquais professional footballer who plays as a right-back for French  club Nîmes.

Career
Labonnne is a youth product of the Martiniquais club US Robert, before moving to mainland France with the academies of JA Drancy, Vaulx-en-Velin, and Lyon La Duchère. He began his senior career with Lyon La Duchère in the Championnat National in 2018. He transferred to Saint-Priest on 2 August 2019. The following season, he moved to the reserves of FC Lorient signing a professional contract.

On 20 June 2022, he transferred to Nîmes. He made his professional debut with Nîmes as a late substitute in a 1–0 Ligue 2 loss to Caen on 30 July 2022.

References

External links
 
 
 

1997 births
Living people
People from Le Lamentin
Martiniquais footballers
Association football fullbacks
Lyon La Duchère players
AS Saint-Priest players
FC Lorient players
Nîmes Olympique players
Ligue 2 players
Championnat National players
Championnat National 2 players
Championnat National 3 players